Sheikh is an Arabic word meaning the elder of a tribe, a revered old man, or an Islamic scholar.

Sheikh, Shaikh, or Sheykh may also refer to:

Communities
 Shaikhs in South Asia, a social and ethnic grouping in South Asia
 Kashmiri Shaikhs, a large Kashmiri clan
 Gujarati Shaikh, a Muslim community found in the state of Gujarat
 Punjabi Shaikhs, a community found in Punjab consisting of Muslim converts from the Brahmins, Rajputs, and Khatris castes
 Rajasthani Shaikh, a Muslim community found in the state of Rajasthan
 Shaikh of Bihar
 Shaikh of Uttar Pradesh
 Sindhi Shaikhs, a community found in Sindh consisting Muslim converts from the Lohana caste

People with the family name
 Al ash-Sheikh, Saudi Arabia's leading religious family
 Aamina Sheikh (born 1981), Pakistani American actress
 Anwar Shaikh (critic of Islam) (1928–2006), Pakistani-born British author
 Anwar Shaikh (economist) (born 1945), Pakistani American economist
 Atif Sheikh (born 1991), English cricketer
 Javed Sheikh (born 1954), Pakistani actor
 Mohammed Sheikh (born 1973), English cricketer
 Saleem Sheikh (born 1967), Pakistani actor
 Shahnaz Sheikh, Pakistani hockey player
 Sheikh Abdullah (1905–1982), first Prime Minister of Jammu and Kashmir
 Simon Sheikh (born 1986), Australian community campaigner and economist

Places
 Sheekh, a town in Sahil Province, Somaliland
 Sheykh, Golestan, a village in Iran
 Sheykh, Kurdistan, a village in Iran
 Sheykh, North Khorasan, a village in Iran
 Sheykh, West Azerbaijan, a village in Iran

Other uses
 "Sheikh" (song), a 2020 song by Indian singer Karan Aujla
 Sheikh (Sufism), a Sufi leader

See also
 Sheik (disambiguation)